Palaeothele is an extinct genus of mesothele spiders, with only one known species Palaeothele montceauensis.

Taxonomy
The genus was first named as Eothele by Paul A. Selden in 1996. However, this name had already been used for a Cambrian brachiopod, so in 2000, Selden proposed the replacement name Palaeothele. The species name montceauensis refers to the location where the fossils were found.

Phylogeny
In 1996, Selden suggested the relationships shown in the cladogram below. (At the time, Attercopus was thought to be a spider; it is now considered to belong to a related but separate group, the Uraraneida.) Palaeothele is shown as sister to the modern genus Heptathela since they both have "tracheal sacs", structures adjacent to the posterior book lungs.

References

Mesothelae
Paleozoic arachnids
Carboniferous animals of Europe